Toʻraqoʻrgʻon is a district of Namangan Region in Uzbekistan. The capital lies at the city Toʻraqoʻrgʻon. Its area is 273 km2. Its population is 228,000 (2021 est.).

The district consists of one city (Toʻraqoʻrgʻon), 13 urban-type settlements (Oqtosh, Yettikon, Yandama, Axsi, Kalvak, Mozorkoʻxna, Buramatut, Shaxand, Olchin, Saroy, Katagon, Kichikqurama, Namdon) and 8 rural communities.

References 

Districts of Uzbekistan
Namangan Region